National Defence Party may refer to:

 National Defence Party (Iceland) 1902–1912
 National Defence Party (Palestine)
 Rashtriya Raksha Dal